"Trying to Love Two Women" is a song written by Sonny Throckmorton, and recorded by American country music group The Oak Ridge Boys.  It was released in April 1980 as the first single from the album Together.  The song was The Oak Ridge Boys' third number one hit on the Billboard country chart. The single stayed at number one for one week and spent a total of twelve weeks on the chart.

Chart performance

Year-end charts

References
 

1980 singles
The Oak Ridge Boys songs
Songs written by Sonny Throckmorton
Song recordings produced by Ron Chancey
MCA Records singles
1980 songs